Phillip David Puzzuoli (born January 12, 1961) is a former American football nose tackle in the National Football League. 

He played football at Stamford Catholic High School, graduating in 1979.

He was selected in the sixth round (149th overall) by the Cleveland Browns in the 1983 NFL Draft after playing college football for the University of Pittsburgh with Dan Marino. 

He played five seasons for the Cleveland Browns from 1983–1987. He played in every game except the three with "replacement players" during the 1987 strike. He provided a strong inside pass rush, his landmark moment being the sack of John Elway that temporarily derailed "The Drive" in the 1986 AFC Championship Game against the Denver Broncos.

He also was in the movie Masters of the Gridiron.

References

1961 births
Living people
Sportspeople from Greenwich, Connecticut
Players of American football from Connecticut
American football defensive tackles
Pittsburgh Panthers football players
Cleveland Browns players